Mary Andray Berkeley (married name Berkeley-Agyepong (born 3 October 1965) is a female retired English long jumper.

Athletics career
Berkeley represented Great Britain in the 1988 Summer Olympics.

She represented England and won a silver medal in the long jump event, at the 1986 Commonwealth Games in Edinburgh, Scotland. Four years later she England again at the 1990 Commonwealth Games in Auckland, New Zealand.

She married Francis Agyepong (a former triple jumper) and became Mary Berkeley-Agyepong.

International competitions

References

1965 births
Living people
Athletes from London
People from Thornton Heath
British female long jumpers
English female long jumpers
Olympic athletes of Great Britain
Athletes (track and field) at the 1988 Summer Olympics
Commonwealth Games silver medallists for England
Commonwealth Games medallists in athletics
Athletes (track and field) at the 1986 Commonwealth Games
Athletes (track and field) at the 1990 Commonwealth Games
Medallists at the 1986 Commonwealth Games